René Foucachon (born 6 January 1966) is a French former professional racing cyclist. He rode in the 1995 Tour de France.

References

External links
 

1966 births
Living people
French male cyclists
People from Bezons
Sportspeople from Val-d'Oise
Cyclists from Île-de-France